The Oran International Arabic Film Festival (}}) is a recurring film festival, held in Oran.

The 2012 top award went to the film Coming Forth by Day by Hala Lotfi.

Participating countries

2010 
In 2010 the festival took place between December 16 to December 23 in Oran.

Participating countries

References 

Annual events in Algeria
Film festivals in Algeria
Events in the Arab world
Film festivals established in 1976